Tosirips magyarus is a species of moth of the  family Tortricidae. It is found in Romania, Bulgaria, Serbia, Slovenia, Hungary, Italy and on Corsica. It is also found in Syria.

The wingspan is 14–19 mm for males and 17–21 mm for females. The ground colour of the forewings is cream ochreous with ferruginous transverse lines. The hindwings are brown. Adults are on wing in May and June.

The larvae feed on Quercus robur.

Subspecies
Tosirips magyarus magyarus (Europe)
Tosirips magyarus syriacus Razowski, 1987 (Syria)

References

	

Moths described in 1987
Archipini